The Lemonthyme Power Station is a conventional hydroelectric power station located in north-western Tasmania, Australia. It is the third station in the MerseyForth run-of-river scheme that comprises seven conventional hydroelectric power stations and one mini hydro station.

Technical details
The Parangana Dam forms Lake Parangana by damming the Mersey River. Water from the lake is diverted west to Lemonthyme Power Station via a -long tunnel, followed by a  single surface penstock. The water then runs through the power station, and is discharged into the River Forth, then down to Lake Cethana.

The power station was commissioned in 1969 by the Hydro Electric Corporation (TAS). The station output, estimated to be  annually, is fed to TasNetworks' transmission grid via two 3-phase 11 kV/220 kV Siemens generator transformers to the outdoor switchyard.

Although much of the water from Lake Parangana travels the approximately 8 km to the Lemonthyme Power Station (which discharges into the River Forth), some water is allowed to continue down the Mersey River for environmental reasons, after running through the Parangana mini hydro station.

See also

 List of power stations in Tasmania

References

Hydroelectric power stations in Tasmania
North West Tasmania
Energy infrastructure completed in 1969
Mersey River (Tasmania)